Richard Shaw (6 August 1825 – 19 January 1876) was a British Liberal Party politician.

Early life
Shaw was born in Burnley, Lancashire and educated at Burnley Grammar School and St Peter's School, York

Career
At the 1868 general election, Shaw was elected as the first Member of Parliament (MP) for the newly enfranchised parliamentary borough of Burnley in Lancashire. He was re-elected in 1874, and held the seat until his death in 1876, aged 50.

References

External links
 

1825 births
1876 deaths
People educated at Burnley Grammar School
Liberal Party (UK) MPs for English constituencies
UK MPs 1868–1874
UK MPs 1874–1880
Politics of Burnley
People from Burnley